The Lea Valley Saints was an Australian rules football club in the Lower Lea Valley region of London, England.

History
The club was formed as a foundation member of the British Australian Rules Football League in 1990.  They competed until 1996, the high point of their existence being a grand final appearance in 1993, although they were defeated by the London Hawks. The founder of BARFL, John Jelley, was the first president of the Saints.

See also

References

External links

Australian rules football teams in London
Australian rules football clubs established in 1990
Australian rules football clubs disestablished in 1996
1990 establishments in England
1996 disestablishments in England